The 1975 Virginia Slims of San Francisco, was a women's tennis tournament that took place on indoor carpet courts at the Civic Auditorium in San Francisco in the United States. It was the fifth edition of the event, which was part of the Virginia Slims Circuit, and was held from January 6 through January 11, 1975. The final was watched by 6,346 spectators who saw first-seeded Chris Evert win the singles title, earning $15,000 first-prize money.

Finals

Singles
 Chris Evert defeated  Billie Jean King 6–1, 6–1
 It was Evert's 1st singles title of the year and the 40th of her career.

Doubles
 Chris Evert /  Billie Jean King defeated  Rosemary Casals /  Virginia Wade 6–2, 7–5

Prize money

References

VS of San Francisco
VS of San Francisco
Silicon Valley Classic
Virginia Slims of San Francisco
Virginia Slims of San Francisco